Mischliffen or Michlifen is a mountain town in the Atlas Mountains of Morocco at an elevation of .

It is considered to be the "Moroccan Aspen" with skiing facilities in the winter..

Sources
Michlifen Weather Forecast, Snow Report and Resort Information, Snow-Forecast.com.

Ski areas and resorts in Morocco
Mountain villages in Morocco
Populated places in Ifrane Province